"Take Me to the Light" is a song by American pop project Francis and the Lights featuring Bon Iver and Kanye West. It is the lead single from their forthcoming album, Same Night Different Dream. The song marks the second collaboration between all three artists following the 2016 single "Friends." It also features additional contributions from Caroline Shaw and uncredited vocals by Chance the Rapper. It was released as a single on August 30, 2019, but did not appear on most streaming services until September 3, 2019.

The song was briefly taken down from streaming services in April 2020, with a new version (featuring additional vocals by Chance the Rapper) being uploaded to Francis' website. This version was uploaded to streaming services in September 2020, removing Bon Iver and Kanye's featuring credits and renamed as "You Still Take Me To The Light".

Track listing

References

External links
 

2019 singles
2019 songs
Francis and the Lights songs
Bon Iver songs
Kanye West songs
Songs written by Justin Vernon
Songs written by Kanye West
Song recordings produced by Kanye West
Songs written by Benny Blanco
Song recordings produced by Benny Blanco
Songs written by Cashmere Cat
Song recordings produced by Cashmere Cat
Songs written by Jeff Bhasker
Song recordings produced by Jeff Bhasker
Songs written by BJ Burton